The Blue Straw Hat is a 1949 West German period comedy film directed by Viktor Tourjansky and starring Margot Hielscher, Karl Schönböck and Mady Rahl. It was shot at the Bavaria Studios in Munich and on location in the city's Nymphenburg Palace Park. The film's sets were designed by the art director Max Mellin and Max Seefelder. It is based on the play of the same title by Friedrich Michael.

Cast

References

Bibliography

External links 
 

1949 films
West German films
1940s German-language films
Films directed by Victor Tourjansky
Films shot at Bavaria Studios
1940s historical comedy films
German historical comedy films
German films based on plays
Films set in the 1900s
German black-and-white films
1949 comedy films
1940s German films
Films shot in Munich